Ruth C. White (March 15, 1942 — June 8, 2017) was an American children's writer. Her novel Belle Prater's Boy was a Newbery Honor Book in 1997.

Work
The City Rose, as Ruth White Miller (1977)
Sweet Creek Holler
Belle Prater's Boy, Newbery Honor, Boston Globe/Horn Book Honor
Memories of Summer  ALA Top Ten Books of the Year, 2001
Tadpole biographical fiction
Buttermilk Hill, a sequel to Weeping Willow
The Search for Belle Prater, a sequel to "Belle Prater's Boy"
Way Down Deep
Little Audrey Booklist Top of the List, 2009
The Treasure of Way Down Deep
You'll Like it Here (Everybody Does)
A month of Sundays 
Self-published:
Diary of a Wildflower, loosely based on the author's mother's early years
Lily of the Valley: Mansions of Karma, book 1
Serendipity: Memoir of a Mystic'''The Blues of Lotus HallHanging With EcilaReferences

External links
Interview by ALAN, The ALAN Review'', Winter 1995
Biography at publisher Scholastic
Reviews

1942 births
2017 deaths
American children's writers
Newbery Honor winners
People from Buchanan County, Virginia
Writers from Virginia
Place of birth missing
American women children's writers
20th-century American women writers
21st-century American women writers